Frea floccifera is a species of beetle in the family Cerambycidae. It was described by Quedenfeldt in 1885.

References

floccifera
Beetles described in 1885